Maryellen MacDonald is Donald P. Hayes Professor of Psychology  at the University of Wisconsin–Madison.  She specializes in psycholinguistics, focusing specifically on the relationship between language comprehension and production and the role of working memory. MacDonald received a Ph.D. from the University of California, Los Angeles in 1986. She is a fellow of the Cognitive Science Society. She is married to fellow psychologist Mark Seidenberg and has two children.

References

External links
Maryellen MacDonald's Homepage
MacDonald-Seidenberg Language and Cognitive Neuroscience Lab

21st-century American psychologists
American women psychologists
Psycholinguists
University of California, Los Angeles alumni
University of Wisconsin–Madison faculty
Year of birth missing (living people)
Living people
Fellows of the Cognitive Science Society
American women academics